The New River tree frog (Trachycephalus hadroceps) is a species of frog in the family Hylidae found in French Guiana, Guyana, Suriname, and possibly Brazil. Its natural habitat is subtropical or tropical moist lowland forests.

References

Trachycephalus
Amphibians described in 1992
Taxonomy articles created by Polbot